Muhammed Ikram (born 1 January 1988) is a retired Pakistani footballer, who played as a striker for Pakistan Army during his five year career. 

Ikram earned his first international cap in 2011 against Bangladesh during the 2014 FIFA World Cup qualifiers. He made his international debut in a 3–0 loss to Bangladesh in Dhaka, coming on as a half-time substitute for Kaleemullah Khan. His second and last international appearance was in the second leg against Bangladesh in Lahore, he came on as a 68th minute substitute for Muhammad Rasool, he was booked at 74th minute of the game.

References

External links

Pakistani footballers
Pakistan international footballers
1988 births
Living people
Association football forwards